Khalfan Mubarak Khalfan Obaid Alrizzi Al Shamsi (born 9 May 1995) is an association football player who plays for Al Jazira.

Club career

Khalfan was born in Ajman to father Mubarak Khalfan, a colonel in Ajman police, former footballer in Ajman club. In 2001, at the age of 6, his father enrolled him in the Ajman youth academy till he reached 12 years. In 2008, he moved to Al Ahli.

Al Jazira
On 12 July 2013, Khalfan signed a three-year deal with Al Jazira. The agreement also stipulates that Al Jazira will pay €375.000 thousand for Al Ahli for the player care.

International career
Khalfan Mubarak made his international debut for the senior team in 2018.

Khalfan in the 2019 AFC Asian Cup scored his first international goal against India.

International goal
Scores and results list the United Arab Emirates' goal tally first.

Reference

External link

Pro League profile

1995 births
Living people
People from the Emirate of Ajman
Al Ahli Club (Dubai) players
Al Jazira Club players
Ajman Club players
Emirati footballers
Association football forwards
Association football midfielders
United Arab Emirates international footballers
UAE Pro League players
2019 AFC Asian Cup players
United Arab Emirates youth international footballers